Broadcasting House, also known as the House of Radio is an office and broadcasting installation building in Athens, Greece. It currently houses the Greek state broadcaster, the Hellenic Broadcasting Corporation.

History

Construction and early years
Construction started in 1968, during the Greek military dictatorship for the housing of EIRT (National Radio Television Foundation), later replaced by the Hellenic Broadcasting Corporation (ERT). Construction was complete by 1969 and it was inaugurated in 1974. It is one of the many examples of Brutalist architecture in public buildings in Athens.

2013: Occupation by workers and police invasion
On 11 June 2013, with the closure of ERT, the redundant workers occupied the building, which became the scene of large-scale demonstrations on the same day, on 11 September and 7 November. On 7 November, the riot police invaded, occupied and evacuated the building, evicting the workers.

The ERT sign, its removal, and re-installation
Prior to its replacement, the original ERT sign was spelled out as "ELLINIKI RADIOFONIA TILEORASI" in Greek, with white text on a blue background.

On 13 April 2014, the old ERT sign was removed from the building in preparation for the installation of ERT's successor, New Hellenic Radio, Internet and Television. On 20 September, the new NERIT sign finished installation. Unlike its original predecessor, it was all blue text without a background, something which remains true in the current ERT sign. The sign remained there until 8 June 2015, when the "N" and "I" were removed to spell ERT after Alexis Tsipras decided to reopen the broadcaster. ERT was restored 3 days later, after NERIT closed on 6:00 EEST.

On 4 November 2017, the entire Greek spelling of ERT "ELLINIKI RADIOFONIA TILEORASI" was then restored on top of the building.

See also
List of Greek-language television channels
List of radio stations in Greece
Television in Greece

References

Buildings and structures in North Athens
Buildings and structures completed in 1969
1969 establishments in Greece
Hellenic Broadcasting Corporation
Agia Paraskevi